Cláudio Barcellos de Barcellos, known as Caco Barcellos, (born 5 March 1950) is a Brazilian journalist, television reporter and writer, specialized in investigative stories and documentaries about human rights, denouncing social injustice and violence. He presents the program Profissão:Repórter at TV Globo.

Barcellos was awarded two times with Prêmio Jabuti on reporting, with the books Rota 66:a história da polícia que mata (1992) and  Abusado: o dono do Morro Dona Marta (2004).

Biography 
Barcelos was born in Porto Alegre, in the Vila São José do Murialdo neighborhood. He worked as a taxi driver and graduated in Journalism at the Pontifical Catholic University. Barcellos started as a reporter for the Porto Alegre newspaper Folha da Manhã, having also written as a freelancer for the magazines Verus, ISTOÉ and Veja and the newspaper Coojornal, of the Rio Grande Do Sul Journalist's Union. In 1979, Barcellos reported about the Sandinista revolution in Nicaragua; in the book Nicarágua:a revolução das crianças.

In 1982 he was hired by TV Globo, where he currently works.

Works

Books 
 1979 – Nicarágua:a revolução das crianças.
 1992 – Rota 66:a história da polícia que mata
 2004 –Abusado: o dono do Morro Dona Marta

Stage play 
 2007 – Osama:The Suicide Bomber of Rio (co-written with Célia Helena for the Conexões project)

References

External links 
 Caco Barcellos' profile in Memória Globo (in Portuguese)

Living people
1950 births
Brazilian investigative journalists
Brazilian television journalists
Brazilian non-fiction writers
Brazilian taxi drivers
People from Porto Alegre